Kennedy Heights is a residential neighborhood of Cincinnati, Ohio, home to Daniel Drake Park. The population was 5,166 at the 2020 census.

History
The neighborhood was named for Lewis Kennedy, who built the Yononte Inn on Davenant Avenue in 1888.

Geography
Kennedy Heights shares its border with Pleasant Ridge and Silverton.

Culture
The Kennedy Heights Park serves the neighborhood.

References

External links
Kennedy Heights Community Council
Finding Aid for Kennedy Heights Community Council records, Archives and Rare Books Library, University of Cincinnati, Cincinnati, Ohio

Neighborhoods in Cincinnati